The 2005 KNSB Dutch Single Distance Championships took place in Assen at the De Smelt ice rink on 5–7 November 2004. Although this tournament     was held in 2004 it was the 2005 edition as it was part of the 2004–2005 speed skating season.

Schedule

Medalists

Men

Source: www.schaatsen.nl  & SchaatsStatistieken.nl

Women

Source: www.schaatsen.nl  & SchaatsStatistieken.nl

References

D
Speed
2005 Single Distance
2005 KNSB Dutch Single Distance Championships